Kenon is a fresh water body in the Chita District, Zabaykalsky Krai, Russia. The name of the lake originated in the Evenki language.

The city of Chita is located near the lakeshore and lake Kenon is surrounded by residential areas, railways, highways and agricultural land. There is also a rather narrow city beach zone which is popular in the summer, although there is substantial pollution. Neolithic and Bronze Age archaeological remains were found by the shores of the lake.

Geography
Kenon lake is part of the Ingoda river basin, It is located in the Chita-Ingoda Depression (Читино-Ингодинская впадина), in the western outskirts of Chita, Zabaykalsky Krai. A few small streams flow into the lake. The main ones are the Ivanovka and Kadala rivers, which have their sources in the neighboring Yablonovy Range.

The lake is frozen between late October and early May.

Fauna
Among the fish species present in the lake, the main ones are perch, Amur chebak, Amur pike, goldfish, Amur carp and  Amur catfish.

See also
List of lakes of Russia
Ivan-Arakhley Lake System, located to the west

References

External links

Кеnоn